Clear Blue Tuesday is a 2009 musical film directed by Elizabeth Lucas. It premiered at the Quad Cinema in New York City on September 3, 2010.

Plot
Over the course of seven years, eleven New Yorkers affected by the events of September 11, 2001 are forced to confront themselves and the dreams that brought them to the city.

Production

Casting
In February 2007, Elizabeth Lucas set out to cast the film. Casting director Michael Cassara brought in over 120 actor/singer-songwriters to audition for roles. Actors were for both on-screen roles and to write their own musical numbers. Much of the cast came from a theatrical background. Several high-profile locations, including 7 World Trade Center and Rockefeller Center were donated for use in the film free of charge.

Shooting
Clear Blue Tuesday was shot in just 19 days on location in New York City. Prior to production, the cast recorded a scratch-track of most of the film's story-telling soundtrack, although two songs were recorded for the first time live on the set: Becca Ayers' "Brand New Sky" and Jan O'Dell's "The Day The Sky Fell".

Cast
Becca Ayers as Rose Burns
Julie Danao as Reena Santiago Isaacs
Vedant Gokhale as Jain Mahajan
Robi Hager as Ricardo Santiago
Erin Hill as Etta Cummins
Cassandra Kubinski as Samantha Putnam
Brother Love as Syd Black
Greg Naughton as Jack King
Jan O'Dell as Caroline King
Jeremy Schonfeld as Daniel Isaacs
Asa Somers as Kyle Cassimer

Critical reception
Slant Magazine gave the film a rating of 1 star out of 4.

References

External links
 
 

2009 films
American musical films
Films based on the September 11 attacks
2000s musical films
2000s English-language films
2000s American films